James Scudamore, 3rd Viscount Scudamore (1684 – 2 December 1716),  was an English landowner and Tory politician who sat in the House of Commons from 1705 to 1716.

Scudamore was baptised on 15 July 1684, the second, but eldest surviving son of John Scudamore, 2nd Viscount Scudamore, and his wife Lady Frances Cecil, daughter of John Cecil, 4th Earl of Exeter. He matriculated at Gloucester Hall, Oxford in 1695 and was awarded DCL in 1712. He inherited the title Viscount Scudamore and the  estate of Holme Lacy from his father in 1697. From 1698 to 1703, he travelled abroad in France, Italy, Holland, Germany, Austria and Switzerland. He married Frances Digby, daughter of Simon Digby, 4th Baron Digby on 7 March 1706.

Scudamore was returned unopposed as Tory Member of Parliament for Herefordshire at the  1705 general election. He was elected MP for Herefordshire again in a contest in 1708. In 1710 he suffered a severe fall from his horse when riding hurriedly to Hereford on electioneering business and suffered some impairment. Nevertheless, he was re-elected MP for Herefordshire at the 1710 general election and returned unopposed in 1713. At the 1715 general election, he changed seats and was elected MP for Hereford instead.

Scudamore died on 2 December 1716 from the effects of his fall from the horse.  He and his wife had one daughter Frances (1711–1750), who married Henry Somerset, 3rd Duke of Beaufort, who divorced her in 1743 for adultery with William Talbot, 1st Earl Talbot. She remarried to Charles FitzRoy-Scudamore and had one daughter Frances (1750–1820), who married Charles Howard, 11th Duke of Norfolk but became insane.

References

1684 births
1716 deaths
People from Herefordshire
James
English MPs 1705–1707
Members of the Parliament of Great Britain for English constituencies
British MPs 1707–1708
British MPs 1708–1710
British MPs 1710–1713
British MPs 1713–1715
British MPs 1715–1722
Viscounts in the Peerage of Ireland